Runayoc (possibly from Quechua runa person, -yuq a suffix) is an archaeological site in Peru on a mountain of that name. It is situated in the Huancavelica Region, Huaytará Province, Huaytará District.

References 

Archaeological sites in Peru
Archaeological sites in Huancavelica Region
Mountains of Peru
Mountains of Huancavelica Region